Mount Hight is a mountain located in Coos County, New Hampshire. The mountain is part of the Carter-Moriah Range of the White Mountains, which runs along the eastern-northeastern side of Pinkham Notch. Mount Hight is flanked on the north by South Carter Mountain across Zeta Pass, and on the southwest by Carter Dome.

The balding summit of Mount Hight has the broadest views of any summit of the Carter-Moriah Range. Conversely, Carter Dome, the highest peak in the range, is wooded and has only limited views.

See also

 List of mountains in New Hampshire
 White Mountain National Forest

External links
 
 Mount Hight on Topozone

Mountains of New Hampshire
Mountains of Coös County, New Hampshire
Mountains on the Appalachian Trail